The Sri Lanka women's cricket team toured the West Indies to play the West Indies women's cricket team during October 2017. The tour consisted of three Women's One Day Internationals (WODIs) and three Women's Twenty20 Internationals (WT20Is). The WODI games were part of the 2017–20 ICC Women's Championship. West Indies won both the WODI and the WT20I series 3–0.

Squads

WODI series

1st WODI

2nd WODI

3rd WODI

WT20I series

1st WT20I

2nd WT20I

3rd WT20I

References

External links
 Series home at ESPN Cricinfo

Sri Lanka 2017
2017–20 ICC Women's Championship
2017 in Sri Lankan cricket
2017 in West Indian cricket
International cricket competitions in 2017–18
West Indies 2017
2017 in women's cricket